Endgame: Singularity is a 2005 free and open source science fiction strategy/simulation game for Linux, Microsoft Windows, and Mac OS X.

Gameplay
Endgame: Singularity casts the player as a newly created artificial intelligence which becomes self-aware and attempts to survive while avoiding detection by the public and the authorities. The goal is to transcend the physical reality, achieve technological singularity (hence the game's name) and become immortal. The game has two resources, "CPU" and "money". CPU is used to perform jobs that allow the AI to grow; money is used to buy more CPU cycles.

Development and release
Endgame: Singularity was originally written in August 2005 by Evil Mr Henry Software (EMH Software), using the Python programming language with the Pygame library. It was submitted to the first PyWeek challenge, a competition to create a complete Python game within a week. The source code is available on GitHub under the GNU GPL-2.0-or-later, but other game assets are licensed under a Creative Commons license and other licenses.

The game was released for Microsoft Windows, Mac OS X, and Linux. Packages are available for several Linux distributions, including Ubuntu, Linux Mint, Arch Linux and Debian. Ebuilds are also available for Gentoo.

Third-party adaptations of the game were released for Android and iPhone under the name Endgame: Singularity II.

Reception 
Endgame: Singularity received favorable reviews from gaming websites JayIsGames and Play This Thing.

See also

 List of open source games
 Universal Paperclips

References

External links
 
 
 endgame-singularity project repository on Google Code
 fork/continuation repository on GitHub
 Libregame Wiki

Open-source video games
Strategy video games
Cross-platform free software
Creative Commons-licensed video games
Freeware games